Between 1961 and 1967, a series of annual giant slalom ski races were held in Canada. The races had a large prize pool and attracted the best skiers from around the world. Over 4000 spectators attended the races and the event and results were reported in most newspapers between London ON and Montreal QC at the time. The races were sponsored by the St. Lawrence Starch Company. The St. Lawrence Starch Company was the manufacture of "Bee Hive Corn Syrup".

1961 - Georgian Peaks Ski Club

1962 -

1963 - Devil's Glen Ski Club
Winner - Ernst Hinterseer (Austria)

1964 - Devil's Glen Ski Club
Winner - Ernst Hinterseer (Austria)

1965 - Lake Louise 

1966 -

1967 -

References

External links

The Fourth Annual Bee Hive Giant Slalom, 1964, Archives of Ontario YouTube Channel

Skiing competitions in Canada
Recurring sporting events established in 1961
Recurring sporting events disestablished in 1967
1961 establishments in Canada
1967 disestablishments in Canada